Tawam, also Tuwwam, Tu'am, or Al-Buraimi Oasis, is a historical oasis region in Eastern Arabia that stretched from, or was located between, the Western Hajar Mountains to the Persian Gulf coast, nowadays forming parts of what is now the United Arab Emirates and western Oman. It is marked by the twin settlements of Al Ain and Al-Buraimi on the UAE-Omani border.

Etymology and geography 

Al-Ain is the main settlement in the Eastern Region of the Emirate of Abu Dhabi, located on the country's eastern border with Oman, where the adjacent town of Al-Buraimi is located. The region is located to the west of the Western Hajar Mountains and the Gulf of Oman, and in the vicinity of the Rub' al-Khali Desert. On the coast of the Arabian or Persian Gulf lies Jumayra in the Emirate of Dubai, which was probably part of this region.

The word 'Tawam' means 'twins', and it reportedly refers to a pair of alfaj (water channels) in the Buraimi region, as identified from the works of people like Salil ibn Raziq in the 19th century, Al-Tabari and Al-Muqaddasi in the 10th century, and consequently people in the 21st century like Timothy Power, an archaeologist and assistant-professor based in Abu Dhabi who helped to found the Buraimi Oasis Landscape Archaeology Project. That said, the region is composed of oases which depended on alfaj for irrigation, such as those of Al-Ain and Qattarah in Al-Ain, and Hamasa in Al-Buraimi.

History and prehistory 

Archaeological remains dating to the Bronze Age and beyond, like at Al-Rumailah, Hili and Jebel Hafeet, have been found in this region. In ancient times, the region was reportedly used by Arabs as a place of gathering, and like Dibba, it was taxed by Al-Julanda, who were clients of the Sasanians, who reported to the Persian marzban (military governor), who was based at Al-Rustaq in what is now Oman.

Like Dibba and present-day Ras Al Khaimah, the region witnessed events relevant to the history of Islam during the Rashidun, Umayyad and Abbasid eras.

Around the Islamic Golden Age in the Middle Ages, the region, with its capital at 'Tawam', was an important sphere of influence for Arabs. Ceramics and other materials found here were believed to have been imported from Mesopotamia, India and China. At this time, Sohar, located to the east of this region, was of such prominence as a trading port on the coast of the Gulf of Oman that it was considered to be the "Dubai or Singapore of its day". A mosque, considered to be the oldest in the country, was found in the vicinity of the Sheikh Khalifa Mosque in Al-Ain by Dr Walid Al Tikriti, besides a falaj, a group of houses, and a village dating to the 9th or 10th century.

Being strategically located near the Western Hajar, the area was an important stop for people and caravans traveling between the mountains and other parts of Arabia, such as Al-Hasa. Not only was the area, being rich in date palms, important for trade, but it was also used by certain people for smuggling slaves, women or children, years before the foundation of the UAE.

See also 
 Middle East
 Arabia
 Near East

References 

Tawam, Eastern Arabia